Christopher Joseph Yates (born 10 August 1981 in Aldershot, Hampshire) is a former English cricketer. Yates was a left-handed batsman who bowled right-arm medium-fast.

Yates made his List-A debut for the Hampshire Cricket Board in the 2000 NatWest Trophy against Huntingdonshire, where he took 3/17 seven overs. Yates played in the 2nd Round of the 2002 Cheltenham and Gloucester Trophy, which was played in 2001 against Ireland where Yates took his final List-A wicket, that of Peter Davy.

External links
Christopher Yates at Cricinfo
Christopher Yates at CricketArchive

1981 births
Living people
Cricketers from Aldershot
English cricketers
Hampshire Cricket Board cricketers